SLAF may refer to
The Sri Lanka Armed Forces, the combined military of the Democratic Socialist Republic of Sri Lanka
The Sri Lanka Air Force, a subset of the above.